Luciana de Andrade (born September 18, 1978) is a Brazilian singer, songwriter, presenter and actress. In 2002 she won the talent show Popstars and joined the Brazilian girl group Rouge until 2004, recording two of the four studio albums, Rouge (2002), C'est La Vie (2003). In 2004 she left the band claiming lack of identification with the musical style of the group that sold 6 million copies in all and became the most successful girl group of Brazil and one of the  twenty that more sold in the world.

In 2004, after leaving the group, Andrade returned to the parents' home in Varginha, where she remained for some months without giving statements to the press. In 2005 returns to São Paulo to study music and to improve its musical ideology, working like vocal of support for Negra Li, Nasi, Theft, Forgotten Boys and Sérgio Britto, besides the American Eric Silver. In 2007 Andrade was invited to become a reporter for the Show Total program, the TVA subscription channel, where she remained until 2009. In 2010 it debuted in the stages of the theater musical Into The Woods, Brazilian version of the Broadway classic. In 2012 it released its second tour, titled Tour O Amor e o Tempo. In 2012 it released its first single, "Mind and Heart", releasing second, "Amanheceu", in 2014.
In 2015 he formed the Duo Elétrico project along with guitarist Ciro Visconti, playing several covers of rock bands, besides becoming vocalist of the return of the band Aries in commemorative tour of 25 years. In 2016, conciliating with the works in the music, she became presenter of the program Estúdio Acesso Cultural, exhibited online, in addition to becoming a singing instructor in the Souza Lima Conservatory, where she had studied music 15 years earlier.

Biography
Born on September 18, 1978, Andrade is a native of Varginha, Minas Gerais, and is the daughter of the couple Walter Andrade and Clair Andrade, and her brothers Guilherme, Gustavo and Lidiane. From childhood she had a passion for music, improvising little shows for her family on the stage in the basement of her house. In 1984, at the age of 5, she sang for the first time in public in a tribute to Mother's Day, and from then on she performed at all the festivals held at her school. Soon after it becomes part of the choir of her church and is invited to interpret the National Anthem in cities of Minas Gerais. As a teenager, she formed her first pop rock band called Trem de Minas, besides working in several places as an English school and even as a trainee in a local television network in your city. In 1999, at the age of 20, she began to compose her own songs, and in the same year she went to the advertising school, where she attended until the sixth semester before leaving and moving to São Paulo to study music, earning a scholarship of the Souza Lima Conservatory.

Career

2002-04: Career with Rouge
In 2002 a friend of Andrade saw the talent show Popstars commercial and encourages her to sign up by sending her audition video. Selected from 30,000 enrolled, Andrade went straight to the second phase of the program, where more than 6,000 were classified in the Anhembi Sambadrome of São Paulo where they performed song evaluation. In the following phases, the jurors became more and more demanding, in this way, selecting for the next stages only the girls who really were able to face the career of popstar. After 5 qualifying rounds, only 8 girls were classified for the final stage that took place at the home of the Popstars. After the 6th and final eliminatory round, the Brazilian girl group was finally formed by Andrade, Li Martins, Aline Wirley, Karin Hils and Fantine Thó. In the same year was released the first studio album, the homonym Rouge, reaching the first position and selling around 2 million copies, receiving the certificate of diamond. His Lead single was "Não Dá para Resistir",  followed by "Ragatanga", track with special participation of Spanish girl group Las Ketchup, in addition to "Beijo Molhado" and "Nunca Deixe de Sonhar," Also the group released the remix album titled Rouge Remixes, selling 150 thousand copies, receiving certificate of gold, and the video album O Sonho de Ser Uma Popstar, bringing its first show.

In 2003 the group released the second album, C'est La Vie, selling around 100,000 copies in the first week of release and around 1 million copies in total, bringing as singles "Brilha La Luna", "Um Anjo Veio Me Falar" and "Vem Cair na Zueira". On December 3 is released the second record of concerts of the group on DVD, titled A Festa dos Seus Sonhos. On February 11, 2004, after some time reflecting on the decision she would make, Andrade announced that she was leaving the group, claiming the lack of identification with the more dance-pop sound that the group was taking, as well as fatigue by the exhausting sequence of concerts, which was interfering in their family and loving relationship: "It was a peaceful negotiation, I want to rest, study music and find out what style I'm going to walk around until I return to the stage. At the time the press revealed that one of the reasons was also that the members received only R$ 500 per show of all the fee charged, valued at R$ 100 thousand, while the rest was for the managers. Along with the Rouge, it sold around 6 million copies among all the material. An album in Spanish language was being recorded to launch the group in the market of Latin America, but with the exit of Luciana, the project was canceled.

2004-10: Participations, television and theater

In 2004, after leaving the group, Andrade returned to the parents' home in Varginha, Minas Gerais, where she remained a few months withdrawn, without giving statements to the press. In the same year he recorded a special participation in the album Trova di Danú, of the folk band Tuatha de Danann, putting the vocals in the track "A Song Of Oengus". In 2005, despite not intending to release a solo material, he returned to São Paulo to study music and improve his musical ideology in works with other artists, recording the supporting vocals of Sangueaudiência and Stand By The DANCE albums of the bands Furto and Forgotten Boys, respectively. In 2006 also records the backing vocals in Negra Livre and Onde Os Anjos Não Ousam Pisar, albums of Negra Li and the vocalista of Ira!, Nasi. In the same year he joined Sérgio Britto's band, a member of the Titãs, traveling throughout Brazil with the Tour Eu Sou 300. Soon after also embarked as backing vocal also of the tour of the American singer Eric Silver. In 2007 Andrade was invited to become a reporter for the Show Total program, the TVA subscription channel. The invitation came after she was interviewed by him and won the interest of the team, staying in the interview reports for two years.

On May 25, 2007 her first tour, titled Luciana Andrade Pocket Show, premiered at the Souza Lima Conservatory music in São Paulo. The show was totally acoustic, with only Andrade on stage, and the repertoire included versions of other artists such as Skank, Kid Abelha and Lulu Santos, as well as unreleased songs of his own, such as "Outra História", "Sempre" and "De Longe". At the time, Andrade announced that her first album would be released in the second half of that year, bringing the production of Briton Paul Ralphes: "There are a lot of partnerships and other people's compositions, I think there's a lot of good music to be recorded. to make an album of only my compositions. The launch forecast is for the second half of this year." The album, however, was never released and the songs were not available anywhere. In 2010 Andrade invested in the career of theater actress, starring in the musical theatre Into The Woods, directed by Armando Bravi Filho and Felipe Senna, a Brazilian version of the Broadway classic, where she played Cinderella. Conciliando the works, in the same year, was part of the band of and Ciro Pessoa, member of Titãs, where it was by some time like backing vocal.

2010-present: Musical releases and internet

On November 21, 2010, Andrade launched a digitally extended play eponymous, directly on their social networks, featuring four tracks - "Tão Diferente", "De Longe", "A Casa Mal-Assombrada" and "Outra História", as well as acoustic version of "De Longe" as bonuses - being a small selection of songs recorded for his first album previously filed. In the same year it records the opening theme of the series Julie e os Fantasmas, of the Network Bandeirantes, that would become part of the soundtrack released next year. In 2012 Andrade was asked by the press about Rouge's return campaign and would return, saying that she would like to do a new job with the other members, provided it was something more mature, without choreography: "I would like to meet the girls, sing a new song or record the Shakira version we wrote together, I think it's a great idea to do something unique and new." On September 20, he premiered his new tour, the O Amor e o Tempo Tuor, at the Café Paon show in São Paulo. The tour brought a repertoire focused on unreleased songs and reverted versions for the folk genre, as well as a band of their own, Fabio Russo on guitar, Jhonny Maia on bass and Léo Baeta on drums.

On December 24, 2012, Andrade released her first official single, "Mind and Heart", which received promotion in several television programs, including TV Gazeta, Leão Lobo Visita and Jornal da Record News, besides the Brasil Ideal and Tá Ligado, of broadcasters in the interior of São Paulo. On May 5, 2014, she released her second single, "Amanheceu", a tribute to his late father. In 2015 she joined drummer André Pinguim of Charlie Brown Jr. to reformulate the band Aries, becoming a vocalist during the new tour after a long period of hiatus, reconciling the shows with the band with his solo work. At the same time it launched its third tour, the Acoustic Tour. Soon after also it forms the Electric Duo along with the guitarist Ciro Visconti, playing covers of bands of rock and own compositions in diverse shows. On July 25, 2016, she became a presenter of the "Estúdio Acesso Cultural" program, directly on the Internet, interviewing artists and proposing duets of different styles, as well as becoming a singing instructor at the Souza Lima Conservatory, where she studied music 15 years earlier.

Personal life
Luciana began dating the photographer Leonardo Pereira in 1998, at age 19, when the two still lived in Varginha. In 1999 it began to study advertising in the University Center of the South of Minas (UNIS), leaving it in the sixth semester. In 2001 decided to move to São Paulo along with her boyfriend to study music, gaining a full scholarship in the Conservatory Souza Lima and going to live in a republic with ten other musicians. In 2003 he married Leonardo in a ceremony only civil and away from the media coverage, having only a few guests. In 2004 she became godmother of the Cultural Artistic Festival, in Varginha, which aims to discover young talents among students of the city, directing them to studies focused on the arts, being one of the jurors annually. In 2013 participated in the campaign Leukemia Tem Healing, which encourages the donation of blood and bone marrow.

Musical characteristics

During its adolescence she had inspirations of diverse artists like Lô Borges, Flávio Venturini and 14 Bis, besides other Brazilian great names like Lulu Santos, Kid Abelha e Pato Fu. According to Luciana herself, the greatest reference for her throughout her career was the Canadian singer Sarah McLachlan, emphasizing that she always wanted to make a sound between pop rock and soft rock: "My style was always Sarah's. I came to São Paulo wanting to make a sound similar to hers." She also stated that she has added musical content to singers Arnaldo Antunes, Erasmo Carlos, Rita Lee, Marisa Monte and Ciro Pessoa. In his passage through the talent show Popstars were cited as reference for her work Elis Regina, Djavan and Ed Motta. Among international names were also mentioned by Lara Fabian, Celine Dion, Chrissie Hynde, Marie Fredriksson, The Beatles, as well as the solo careers of John Lennon e Paul McCartney.

The Minas Gerais bands Skank and Jota Quest were reinforced as two of their greatest influences. In 2011, Luciana stated in an interview with Popline that the greatest reference to her solo career were folk and indie pop music, introducing artists like Neil Young, Joni Mitchell, Patti Smith and Nick Drake to the ones she had heard most.

Discography

Extended plays

Singles

Other appearances

Music videos

Filmography

Films

Theatre appearances

Tours

Officials
 Luciana Andrade Pocket Show 
 O Amor e o Tempo Tour 
 Acustic Tour 
 Duo Elétrico 

With the Áries band
 O Retorno de Áries

References

1978 births
Living people
21st-century Brazilian actresses
21st-century Brazilian singers
21st-century guitarists
21st-century Brazilian women singers
Brazilian women pop singers
Brazilian women singer-songwriters
Brazilian folk singers
Brazilian indie pop musicians
Brazilian pop guitarists
Brazilian singer-songwriters
Brazilian stage actresses
Brazilian women guitarists
Brazilian writers
English-language singers from Brazil
Feminist musicians
Folk guitarists
People from Varginha, Minas Gerais
Popstars winners
Rouge (group) members
21st-century women guitarists